Oneok, Inc. is an American diversified corporation focused primarily on the natural gas industry, and headquartered in Tulsa, Oklahoma. The company is part of the Fortune 500 and S&P 500.  Oneok was founded in 1906 as Oklahoma Natural Gas Company, but it changed its corporate name to Oneok in December 1980. It also owns major natural gas liquids (NGL) systems due to the 2005 acquisition of Koch Industries natural gas businesses.

Oneok's Energy Services operation focuses primarily on marketing natural gas and related services throughout the U.S. Energy Services, which derives more than 84 percent of its earnings from the physical marketing business, showed an operating income increase of $26.5 million. Energy Services’ retail business participates in customer gas choice program in Nebraska and Wyoming.

Oneok's predecessor, Oklahoma Natural Gas Company (ONG), had been headquartered in an Art Deco building on the northwest corner of Seventh Street and Boston Avenue in Tulsa since 1928. In 1982, Oneok chairman, J. E. Tyree, announced plans to demolish the ONG building and replace it with a new 16-story tower. However, this did not happen. Instead, Oneok bought a new Cities Service Company building still under construction (later renamed Citgo) in August, 1982. The Cities Service Company, undergoing financial difficulties, already had a project underway to build a high-rise headquarters building at Fifth and Boulder. Oneok realized that it would be more economical to cap the planned structure at 17 stories and move its headquarters there, rather than to proceed with its original plan. It completed the new black granite and glass tower in 1984.

In 2009, Oneok sponsored the construction of Oneok Field, the new Tulsa Drillers minor league baseball stadium in downtown Tulsa.

History

Oklahoma Natural Gas Company (ONG) was founded in 1906 by two attorneys, Dennis T. Flynn and Charles B. Ames, who planned to develop the natural gas that was a byproduct of the northern Oklahoma oilfields. ONG incorporated on October 9, 1906, under the laws of Oklahoma Territory. Flynn was president and Ames the secretary.  Joined by Chicago entrepreneur, H. M. Byllesby, for whom they worked, they also formed the Oklahoma Gas and Electric Company (OG&E) to bring natural gas from the Cleveland Oil Field to Oklahoma City, using it to generate electric power. Byllesby soon resigned, but Glenn T. Braden and Theodore N. Barnsdall joined ONG. Both were already experienced oilmen. Together, they owned the Osage and Oklahoma Gas Company. Braden had been an executive of Standard Oil Company and Barnsdall an oil producer. ONG built a natural gas pipeline from the Osage fields to Oklahoma City which went into service December 28, 1907. ONG extended the line to Guthrie and Shawnee. It also built the first gas pipeline compressor station in the state in 1910. Braden followed Flynn as president of the company.

ONG continued to build pipelines throughout Oklahoma. In 1928, it built its noted headquarters building in Tulsa. It reorganized several times, first becoming a Maryland Corporation, then a Delaware Corporation.

In December 1980, the Oklahoma Natural Gas board voted to reorganize as a holding company, Oneok Inc. Oklahoma Natural Gas became Oneok's leading subsidiary, headquartered in Oklahoma City. The parent company is headquartered in Tulsa.

In 1996, Oneok acquired the natural gas operations of Kansas utility Western Resources (now Westar Energy) and reorganized them as Kansas Gas Service. In 2003, it acquired the Texas properties of Southern Union Gas, which became another Oneok operating company, Texas Gas service.

In 2007, Fortune magazine named Oneok the most admired company in the energy industry.

In February 2014, Oneok spun off its natural gas distribution companies–Oklahoma Natural Gas, Kansas Gas Service, and Texas Gas Services–into a separate publicly traded company, ONE Gas. For all intents and purposes, Oneok had spun out the core of the original Oklahoma Natural Gas.

For many years until 2017, Oneok was an MLP and issued its holders a K-1 every year. That year it became a regular company (C-corporation) and it issues its stockholders a yearly 1099 summarizing their income from the company.

Notes

See also
 Guardian Pipeline
 Oklahoma Natural Gas Company Building
 ONE Gas

References

External links
Official Website

 01
Energy companies of the United States
Natural gas companies of the United States
Natural gas pipeline companies
Petroleum in Oklahoma
Companies based in Tulsa, Oklahoma
Non-renewable resource companies established in 1906
American companies established in 1906
1906 establishments in Oklahoma Territory
Companies listed on the New York Stock Exchange